The United States Senate election of 1916 in New Jersey was held on November 7, 1916. 

Incumbent Democratic Senator James E. Martine ran for re-election to a second term in office, but was defeated by Republican State Senator Joseph S. Frelinghuysen Sr.

Primary elections were held on September 26. Senator Martine defeated a challenge from John W. Wescott, the Attorney General of New Jersey and an ally of President Woodrow Wilson. The Republican nomination narrowly went to State Senator Joseph S. Frelinghuysen Sr. over former Governor Franklin Murphy.

This was the first popular election for United States Senator in New Jersey history, following the passage of the Seventeenth Amendment to the United States Constitution. This was also the first of four straight elections to this seat in which the incumbent was defeated.

Democratic primary

Candidates
August M. Bruggeman, Hoboken resident
James E. Martine, incumbent Senator since 1911
Frank M. McDermit, Newark attorney and candidate for Senate in 1911 and 1913
John W. Wescott, Attorney General of New Jersey

Campaign
Senator Martine drew a primary challenge from Woodrow Wilson ally John W. Wescott, the state Attorney General. Wescott's strong alliance with President Wilson and Martine's opposition to administration policy on World War I and general Anglophobia led some Democrats to think him vulnerable. Martine had previously said that he would rather retire to his Union County farm than go to the White House "for orders."

A third candidate from Newark, Frank McDermit, may have drawn away Martine supporters in Essex County. Wescott had the support of the Essex County machine.

Results
Martine defeated Wescott by a large margin in Hudson County and won the strong support of ethnic Germans, who approved of his critical stance on Wilson's war policy. Despite strong opposition from the Nugent machine in Essex and McDermit's candidacy, Martine carried the county narrowly with a plurality.

Given his close alliance with Wilson personally and politically, Wescott's loss was seen as a blow to the administration and Wilson's re-election hopes.

Republican primary

Candidates
Joseph S. Frelinghuysen, former State Senator from Somerset County and President of the New Jersey Senate
Franklin Murphy, former Governor of New Jersey (1902–05)

Campaign
In the campaign, the statewide party machine backed Murphy. Opponents also accused Frelinghuysen of non-residency, given that his winter home and business were in New York. Frelinghuysen was also opposed by automobile owners, based on his record as State Senator. On primary day, most observers expected Murphy to win.

Results
Frelinghuysen won a surprise victory over Murphy, who managed only a small plurality of under 5,000 in his home base of Essex County.

General election

Candidates
Livingston Barbour (Prohibition)
William C. Doughty (Socialist)
Joseph S. Frelinghuysen (Republican), former State Senator from Somerset County and President of the New Jersey Senate
Rudolph Katz (Socialist Labor)
James E. Martine (Democrat), incumbent Senator

Results

See also 
1916 United States Senate elections

References

New Jersey
1916
1916 New Jersey elections